Events in the year 1639 in Norway.

Incumbents
Monarch: Christian IV

Arts and literature

Architecture 
The Cathedral Hellig Trefoldigheds Kirke in Christiania completed (burned down in 1686).

Births

Christian Stockfleth, civil servant (died 1704).

Deaths
1 June – Niels Simonssøn Glostrup, bishop.

See also

References